Thirparappu is a town located in the Kanyakumari District in the Indian state of Tamil Nadu. It is a popular tourist destination.

Geography

Tirparappu falls

The waterfall flow with great force for around seven months. The bed above the falls is a rocky mass that extends up to a distance of about quarter of a kilometre upstream, with a weir constructed for supplying water to nearby paddy fields.

Near the falls is a fortified temple dedicated to Lord Shiva, called the Mahadever Kovil. It is third of the twelve Shivalayas, famous for the Shivalaya Ottam during the Indian festival of Shivaratri. Devotees believe Lord Mahadev lives here as Virabhadra, a fierce incarnation of the Lord Shiva to kill Daksha Prajapati, after the death Satidevi. There are many old inscriptions in this temple including the one of the Pandiya King dated ninth century. This temple is built around  A.D. 9th Century.

Demographics
 India census, Thirparappu (Thriparappu) had a population of 21,722. Males constitute 49% of the population and females 51%. Thirparappu (Thriparappu) has an average literacy rate of 75%, higher than the national average of 59.5%: male literacy is 78%, and female literacy is 72%. In Thirparappu (Thriparappu), 10% of the population is under 6 years of age.

References

1. http://www.shaivam.org/siddhanta/sptthirparappu.htm
2. http://www.tn.gov.in/district_statistics.html Government of Tamil Nadu - District Statistics

Cities and towns in Kanyakumari district
Hindu temples in Kanyakumari district